The Executioner's Song is a 1979 novel by Norman Mailer.

Executioner's Song or The Executioner's Song may also refer to:
 Executioner's Song (album), by thrash metal band Razor
 The Executioner's Song (film), a 1982 film adaption of the book
 "The Executioner's Song", an episode of One Foot in the Grave
 "The Executioner's Song", an episode of Supernatural

See also 
 "Song of the Executioner" (Highlander)
 "X-Cutioner's Song", a X-Men comic crossover story arc